Dubautia microcephala, the small-head dubautia,  is a species of flowering plant in the family Asteraceae. It is endemic to the island of Kauai in Hawaii.

References

microcephala
Endemic flora of Hawaii
Biota of Kauai
Critically endangered flora of the United States
Taxonomy articles created by Polbot